Don Bennett (1910–1986) was an Australian aviation pioneer and bomber pilot.

Donald or Don Bennett may also refer to:

 Don Bennett (cricketer) (1933–2014), English cricketer and footballer
 Don Bennett (politician) (1931–1987), American military officer, businessman, and politician
 Donald V. Bennett (1915–2005), U.S. Army general
 Donald W. Bennett (born 1927), United States Air Force general
 Don Bennett (baseball) (fl. 1930), American baseball player